The Cohaesibacteraceae are a family of bacteria.

References

Hyphomicrobiales